Calstock Rural District was a local government division of Cornwall in England, UK, between 1894 and 1934. Established under the Local Government Act 1894, the rural district was abolished in 1934, enlarging St Germans Rural District.

During its existence the district contained the village and civil parish of Calstock.

References

Districts of England created by the Local Government Act 1894
1934 disestablishments in England
Rural districts of England
Local government in Cornwall
History of Cornwall